Hypermnestra (Hypermnēstra), in Greek mythology, was a Libyan princess and, as one of the 50 Danaids, the daughter of King Danaus, son of King Belus of Egypt. Her mother was Elephantis,  full sister to Gorgophone.

Mythology
Hypermnestra's father Danaus was the twin brother of Aegyptus, who demanded the marriage betrween the Danaids and his 50 sons. But her father Danaus, who was unhappy with this kind of arrangement, ordered them to flee to Argos where King Pelasgus (Gelanor) ruled. When Aegyptus and his sons arrived to take the Danaides, Danaus gave them up to spare the Argives the pain of a battle. However, Danaus instructed Hypermnestra and the other Danaids to kill their husbands in their wedding night. Her forty-nine sisters followed through, except her, because her husband, Lynceus, honored her wish to remain a virgin. Danaus was angry with this disobedience and threw her to the Argive courts. Aphrodite intervened and saved Hypermnestra. Lynceus later killed Danaus as revenge for the death of his brothers. Hypermnestra and Lynceus' son, Abas, would be the first king of the Danaid Dynasty. In some versions of the legend, the Danaides were punished in the underworld by being forced to carry water in a jug with holes, or a sieve, so the water always leaked out. Hypermnestra, however, went straight to Elysium.

Argive genealogy

Cultural depictions
Ovid wrote a letter from Hypermnestra to Lynceus which appears in his Heroides.

Geoffrey Chaucer wrote a Legend of Hypermnestra.

Francesco Cavalli wrote Hipermestra, first performed at Florence on 12 June 1658, as a festa teatrale opera.

Charles-Hubert Gervais composed the opera Hypermnestre, first performed at the Académie Royale de Musique (the Paris Opera) on 3 November 1716.

Ignaz Holzbauer composed a German opera entitled Hypermnestra with a German libretto by Johann Leopold van Ghelen that was performed in Vienna in 1741.

Antonio Salieri composed the opera Les Danaïdes with a French libretto by François-Louis Gand Le Bland Du Roullet and Louis-Théodore de Tschudi in 1784, premiering in Paris.

See also

City of Lyrceia

Notes

References 
Ovid, Heroides 14.
Eusebuis, Chronicon 46.8-12, 47.22-23.
Orosius, Historiae adversus paganos I.ii.i.
Lactantius Placidus, Commentarii in Statii Thebaida II.222.

Danaids
Queens in Greek mythology
Princesses in Greek mythology